Flying Doctors may refer to:

 Royal Flying Doctor Service
 The Flying Doctors, an Australian television drama series
 The Flying Doctor, a 1936 Australian-British film
 Los Médicos Voladores, the flying doctors, based in Latin America
 Flying Doctors of America
 Flying Doctors of Malaysia
 The Flying Doctors of East Africa, a 1969 film
 A service of the African Medical and Research Foundation, documented by the 1969 film